Oscar Wilhelm Johansson (22 February 1882, Pernå - 31 May 1947) was a Finnish lawyer, civil servant and politician. He was a member of the Parliament of Finland from 1907 to 1908, representing the Social Democratic Party of Finland (SDP).

References

1882 births
1947 deaths
People from Pernå
People from Uusimaa Province (Grand Duchy of Finland)
Swedish-speaking Finns
Social Democratic Party of Finland politicians
Members of the Parliament of Finland (1907–08)
University of Helsinki alumni